William H. Clearwater (1875 - September 25, 1948) of Ellwood, Pennsylvania was the pocket billiards and continuous pool champion of the world.

References

1875 births
1948 deaths
World champions in pool